The 1950 All-American Girls Professional Baseball League season marked the eight season of the circuit. The teams Fort Wayne Daisies, Grand Rapids Chicks, Kenosha Comets, Muskegon Lassies, Peoria Redwings, Racine Belles, Rockford Peaches and South Bend Blue Sox competed through a 112-game schedule.

In 1950 the league used a livelier 10 inches ball. Finally, the batting was able to take advantage of the pitching, when five hitters reached the .300 average mark for the year. Fort Wayne's rookie Betty Foss led the circuit with a .346 average, to set a new season mark.

Nevertheless, three no-hitters were recorded in the season, two of them by Jean Cione of Kenosha during the month of August. Her first was a 12-inning gem against Grand Rapids, and the second came in a seven-inning shutout over Racine. Previously, Kenosha's Ruby Stephens had pitched a nine-inning no-no against the Lassies in July.

Grand Rapids' Alma Ziegler posted a 19–7 record and a solid 1.38 earned run average in 35 games, leading all pitchers in winning percentage (.732). She also tossed 43 straight shutout inning, and finished second in ERA behind South Bend's Jean Faut (1.12). Ziegler was honored with the Player of the Year Award.

The league returned to the Shaugnessy format during the playoffs, featuring the top four teams of the season. In the best-of-five first round, first place Rockford won Kenosha and second place Fort Wayne defeated fourth place Grand Rapids. The final series took all seven games to decide the champion team. After winning the first two games, Rockford lost the next two games to Fort Wayne. Rockford took a 3–2 advantage in Game 5, but Fort Wayne won the next contest to send the series to a seventh game. Finally, Rockford never gave Fort Wayne a chance at another upset and won the series, four to three games. Helen Nicol was credited with three of the four victories of Rockford in the finals, including a shutout in decisive Game 7. Bill Allington guided the Peaches to their third title in a row, fourth overall, to set two all-time records for a manager.

In 1950 the AAGPBL declined in attendance for the second consecutive year. Poor financial management finally caught up to the league and it began to slide. At the end of the season, team directors voted to purchase the league from Arthur Meyerhoff and operate their teams independently. That season had been a nightmare for Muskegon, after registering the worst record in the circuit and a relocation during the midseason to Kalamazoo, Michigan, where the team was renamed the Kalamazoo Lassies. Besides this, the Racine franchise, a two-time champion and one of the four original teams, had to move to Battle Creek, Michigan. The team would be renamed the Battle Creek Belles for the next season.

Standings

Postseason

Batting statistics

Pitching statistics

All-Star Game

See also
1950 Major League Baseball season
1950 Nippon Professional Baseball season

Sources

External links
AAGPBL Official Website
AAGPBL Records
Baseball Historian files
The Diamond Angle profiles and interviews
SABR Projects – Jim Sargent articles
YouTube videos

All-American Girls Professional Baseball League seasons
1950 in baseball
1950s in women's baseball
All